Ovid Edward Nicholson (December 30, 1888 – March 24, 1968) was an outfielder in Major League Baseball. He played for the Pittsburgh Pirates in 1912.

References

External links

1888 births
1968 deaths
Major League Baseball outfielders
Pittsburgh Pirates players
Baseball players from Indiana
Minor league baseball managers
Great Bend Millers players
Frankfort Statesmen players
Wichita Witches players
St. Joseph Drummers players
Chattanooga Lookouts players
Hannibal Mules players
Quincy Gems players
Nashville Vols players